Jane Burton (born 1966) is an Australian photographer who lives and works in Melbourne.

Exhibitions
The Eye of the Beholder, Glen Eira City Gallery, Melbourne, Australia, 2009. A retrospective.
I Did It For You, Centre for Contemporary Photography, Melbourne, Australia, 2005.

Collections
Burton's work is held in the following public collections: National Gallery of Victoria, Melbourne; Tasmanian Museum and Art Gallery, Hobart; Newcastle Art Gallery, Newcastle; Monash University, Melbourne and Monash Gallery of Art, Wheelers Hill.

References

General references
Jane Burton, Artabase

External links

Australian photographers
Living people
1966 births
Australian women photographers